Thate may refer to:

People
Ajahn Thate (1902–1994), Thai Buddhist teacher and writer
Carole Thate (born 1971), Dutch former field hockey player
Hilmar Thate (1931–2016), German actor

Other uses
Tȟaté (god), a wind spirit in Lakota mythology
Maja e Thatë, a mountain peak of the Albanian Alps
Mali i Thatë, a mountain in southeast Albania